Carlos Eduardo Manso de Carvalho, known as Carlos Eduardo (born 4 January 1993) is a Brazilian football player who plays for Académico de Viseu.

Club career
He made his professional debut in the Segunda Liga for Braga B on 11 August 2012 in a game against Benfica B.

His rank position as forward player is 168th/1284 players

References

1993 births
Sportspeople from Rio Grande do Norte
Living people
Brazilian footballers
Brazilian expatriate footballers
Expatriate footballers in Portugal
S.C. Braga B players
F.C. Tirsense players
ACS Poli Timișoara players
Expatriate footballers in Romania
Liga II players
Académico de Viseu F.C. players
Liga Portugal 2 players
Association football midfielders